Never Weaken is a 1921 American silent comedy film starring Harold Lloyd and directed by Fred Newmeyer.

It was Lloyd's last short film, running to three reels, before he moved permanently into feature-length production. It was also one of his trademark 'thrill' comedies, featuring him dangling from a tall building.  Lloyd and his crew honed and perfected their "thrill" filming techniques in this film, and put them to use in the 1923 feature Safety Last!

Plot 

Harold works in an office on a tall building next to his girlfriend Mildred (Mildred Davis). He assumes they will be married, but overhears her talking to a man who says to her, "Of course I will marry you."

Distraught, he decides to commit suicide, blindfolding himself and setting up a gun which will fire when he pulls a string attached to the trigger. But after putting on the blindfold he accidentally knocks over a bulb which pops, and he assumes he has shot himself. At that moment, a girder from the next door construction site swings into his office, lifting him and his chair outside. Pulling off the blindfold, the first thing he sees is a sculpture high on his building which he takes to be an angel, and he assumes he is in Heaven. However a jazz band on an adjacent rooftop garden soon disabuses him of that notion, and he realises he is high above the city.

After several perilous escapades high on the construction site, he finally makes it to the ground, only to realise that the man Mildred was talking to was her clergyman brother, who has agreed to officiate at their wedding.

Cast
 Harold Lloyd as The Boy
 Mildred Davis as The Girl
 Roy Brooks as The Other Man
 Mark Jones as The Acrobat
 Charles Stevenson as The Police Force
 William Gillespie as The Doctor, the Girl's employer (uncredited)
  George Rowe as Crossed-Eyed Accident Victim

External links

 
 Progressive Silent Film List: Never Weaken at silentera.com
 
 
 

1921 films
1921 comedy films
American silent short films
American black-and-white films
Silent American comedy films
Films directed by Sam Taylor
Films directed by Fred C. Newmeyer
Films with screenplays by H. M. Walker
Films with screenplays by Sam Taylor (director)
1921 short films
American comedy short films
1920s American films